John B. Boucher was a Canadian Métis leader. He was active in Métis politics since the 1960s. He sat on the Aboriginal Advisory Board for the RCMP and was a member of the Senate of the Métis Nation—Saskatchewan as well as a member of the Métis National Council. He received the Order of Canada in 2002.
 
During Nelson Mandela's visit to Canada on September 24, 1998 Senator Boucher tied a ceinture fléchée around Mandela's waist which President Mandela later wore during his address to the House of Commons of Canada.

See also

 St. Louis, Saskatchewan

References

Indigenous leaders in Saskatchewan
Canadian Métis people
Métis politicians
Companions of the Order of Canada
1938 births
2010 deaths